Rohese de Clare (bef. 1166) was a member of the wealthy and powerful de Clare family and a strong patron of Monmouth Priory.

Life 
Rohese was a daughter of Gilbert Fitz Richard de Clare and Adeliza de Clermont. In , she married Baderon fitzWilliam of Monmouth. Her father being already dead by that date, the wedding was celebrated at Striguil Castle (Chepstow), stronghold of her brother Gilbert fitzGilbert de Clare, who gave the bride away.

Rohese is most notable for her generosity to Monmouth Priory beginning soon after her marriage. As a married woman she acted through her husband, who records in the charter that the gifts were made "by myself and my wife, at her request ... at the Feast of All Saints on the same day on which she was married to me at Striguil". The gift was put into effect "on the Feast of St. Martin next following" at a ceremony at Monmouth attended by Rohese's brothers Walter and Gilbert and by Gilbert's wife Isabel de Beaumont (a former mistress of Henry I). The gift consisted of a tithe of the regular revenues of the town of Monmouth, to be paid in installments three times each year. In 1144 Rohese and Baderon made further donations to Monmouth Priory.

Family 
Together Rohese and Baderon had:  
 Gilbert; who succeeded his father as lord of Monmouth. 
 Rohese, who married Hugh de Lacy, Lord of Meath about 1155.
 Payn (fl. 1144).
 Robert (fl. 1144),

References

External links 
 

1149 deaths
People from Monmouth, Wales
Date of birth unknown
Rohese